She and the Three (German: Sie und die Drei) is a 1935 German comedy crime film directed by Victor Janson and starring Gustav Waldau, Charlotte Susa and Hubert von Meyerinck.

The film's sets were designed by the art directors Wilhelm Depenau and Erich Zander. It was partly shot on location in Hamburg.

Cast
 Gustav Waldau as Dr. Bittner  
 Charlotte Susa as Lisa, seine Tochter  
 Hubert von Meyerinck as André Nicol  
 Walter Steinbeck as Alexander Bobinsky  
 Hans Söhnker as Rudolf Rostorff, Zimmerkellner  
 Harald Paulsen as Peter Hüsing, Friseur  
 Kurt Vespermann as Toni Kemser, Chauffeur  
 Hilde Krüger as Christine Glöckner, Zimmermädchen  
 Antonie Jaeckel as Marie, eine alte Hotelbedienstete 
 Otto Stoeckel as Maranu  
 Rudolf Essek as Der Geschäftsführer der Hotelbar  
 Hans von Zedlitz as Der Hoteldirektor

References

Bibliography 
 Bock, Hans-Michael & Bergfelder, Tim. The Concise Cinegraph: Encyclopaedia of German Cinema. Berghahn Books, 2009.

External links 
 

1935 comedy films
German comedy films
1935 films
Films of Nazi Germany
1930s German-language films
Films directed by Victor Janson
Films shot in Hamburg
German black-and-white films
1930s German films